Sandor Szalontay (born 3 July 1990) is a Hungarian male track cyclist, representing Hungary at international competitions. He competed at the 2015 UEC European Track Championships in the sprint event and at the 2016 UEC European Track Championships in the 1 km time trial event.

References

1990 births
Living people
Hungarian male cyclists
Hungarian track cyclists
Place of birth missing (living people)
Cyclists at the 2019 European Games
European Games competitors for Hungary